Elin Anna Labba (born November 30, 1980, Kiruna, Sweden) is a Sámi author and journalist. She has won multiple prizes for her first book Herrarna satte oss hit: om tvångsförflyttningarna i Sverige, which describes the forced migration of the Sámi from Norway to Sweden from 1919 to 1920.

Early years and education 
Elin Anna Labba was born on November 30, 1980 in  Kiruna, Sweden, where she also grew up. She moved to Gothenburg to study journalism at the Department of Journalism, Media and Communication at the University of Gothenburg. At the same time she was studying, Labba was also working as a journalist for P4 Norrbotten, SR Sápmi, and the Sámi news magazine Samefolket. She graduated from the University of Gothenburg in 2008.

Career 
Since she graduated, Labba worked as the editor-in-chief of Nuorat and as the director of communications at Laponiatjuottjudus. Currently, she is employed as a project manager at the writer's center Tjállegoahte in Jokkmokk, Sweden.

In 2020, she debuted as an author with the Swedish-language book Herrarna satte oss hit: om tvångsförflyttningarna i Sverige, which was translated and released the same year in Northern Sámi under the title Hearrát dat bidje min: bággojohtimiid birra. It was translated from Swedish to Norwegian Bokmål and published in 2021 as Herrene sendte oss hit: om tvangsflyttingen av samene.

Awards 
In 2020, Labba was awarded the August Prize for her book Herrarna satte oss hit: om tvångsförflyttningarna i Sverige. In 2021, she won the Norrland Literature Prize for the same book. In 2022, she was awarded the Hedevind Plaquette.

Bibliography

Books 
 Herrarna satte oss hit: om tvångsförflyttningarna i Sverige, Norstedts 2020, ISBN 9789113101682 (in Swedish)
 Hearrát dat bidje min: bággojohtimiid birra, Norstedts 2020, ISBN 9789113102436 (translated from Swedish to Northern Sámi by Lea Simma)
 Herrene sendte oss hit: om tvangsflyttingen av samene, Pax 2021, ISBN 9788253042480 (translated from Swedish to Norwegian Bokmål by Trude Marstein)

Anthologies 
 Du blir vad du säger: om hatspråk, yttrandefrihet och vikten av ett demokratiskt samtal, Sjöberg, Henrik, Carlberg, Ingrid, and  Bengtsson, Jesper. Norstedts 2021, ISBN 9789113117881 (in Swedish)
 Inifrån Sápmi: vittnesmål från stulet land, red. Patricia Fjellgren and Malin Nord, Verbal 2021, ISBN 9789189155497 (in Swedish)

References 

Swedish Sámi people
People from Kiruna Municipality
Swedish journalists
1980 births
Living people